Andrew Michael Middlehurst (born 16 July 1962 in St. Helens) is an active British racing driver.  Andy runs a successful Nissan dealership (Middlehurst Nissan) in the North West of England that is famed for its involvement with the Nissan Skyline GT-R, resulting it being officially imported into the country and more recently the new R35 Nissan GT-R.

After starting his career on motorbikes, in Junior Grass track and Speedway, he first raced in cars in 1980 with Formula Ford. After becoming Dunlop Star of Tomorrow Champion in 1982 his early racing included Formula Ford 1600, racing against Ayrton Senna in 1981.Andy went on to Rallying in National and International Rallys, including the 1984 RAC Rally and 24 hours of Iepres, in which he won class in a semi works Toyota Corolla GT. He Then won Saloon car titles in 1988 Monroe Saloon Championship and 1989 Firestone Saloon Champion, in Vw golf 16v.
He was 1990 National Production Saloon Car Champion, in A Ford Sierra Cosworth, which led to a drive in the prestigious British Touring Car Championship. His first full BTCC season came in 1991 for Graham Goode Racing in a Ford Sierra Cosworth. An impressive season saw him finish ninth on points, including one podium in the final round at Silverstone. In 1992 he drove for the works Nissan team alongside Keith O'Dor. 
In 1993 he started competing in the National Saloon Championship. He won four back-to-back titles from 1995, all with Nissans. He returned to the BTCC in 2000 for just two rounds at Oulton Park with a Nissan Primera in the newly introduced Class B.

Middlehurst now participates in the Historic Formula One Championship and has numerous race victories, including events at Oulton Park and Monaco. Andy Middlehurst has won the Glover Trophy at Goodwood revival a total of 7 times from 2011 to 2021 in Jim Clarks 1963 championship winning Lotus 25. Middlehurst in the same Lotus 25 R4, has won 4 Monaco Historique Pre 1966 Grand prix car races outright, 2012 /2014/2016 and 2018.

Racing record

Complete British Touring Car Championship results
(key) Races in bold indicate pole position (1 point awarded - 2000 in class) Races in italics indicate fastest lap (1 point awarded - 1988 in class)

 – Race was stopped due of heavy rain. No points were awarded.

References

External links
Profile at BTCC Pages.

1963 births
Living people
English racing drivers
British Touring Car Championship drivers
Sportspeople from St Helens, Merseyside